R v Andrews,  [1990] 3 S.C.R. 870 is a decision of the Supreme Court of Canada on the freedom of expression under section 2(b) of the Canadian Charter of Rights and Freedoms. It is a companion case to R v Keegstra. The Court upheld the criminal provision that prohibits communicating statements that wilfully promote hatred.

Background
Donald Andrews was the leader of a white supremacist political group known as the Nationalist Party of Canada and Robert Smith was the party secretary. Together they were in charge of the party's bi-monthly magazine called the National Reporter which made claims against the Jewish and black peoples. Both Andrews and Smith were charged with "unlawfully communicating statements, other than in private conversation, which willfully promoted hatred against an identifiable group" contrary to s. 319(2) of the Criminal Code.

At trial they were found guilty for promoting hatred. On appeal to the Court of Appeal for Ontario Justice Cory found that section 319(2) violated section 2(b) of the Charter but could be justified under section 1.

The question before the Supreme Court was
 whether s. 319(2) of the Criminal Code violated section 2(b) of the Charter, and if so, whether the violation was justifiable under section 1.
 whether s. 319(3)(a) of the Criminal Code violated section 11(d) of the Charter, and if so, whether the violation was justifiable under section 1.

The court held that section 319(2) and 319(3)(a) violated the Charter but were saved under section 1.

Reasons of the court
Chief Justice Dickson, writing for the majority, upheld the Criminal Code provisions. Dickson looked to his opinion in R. v. Keegstra and applied the reasoning from the decision came to the same conclusion that the law should be upheld.

See also
 List of Supreme Court of Canada cases (Dickson Court)

External links
 
 case summary at mapleleafweb.com

Canadian freedom of expression case law
Supreme Court of Canada cases
Canadian Charter of Rights and Freedoms case law
1990 in Canadian case law
Neo-Nazism in Canada